Stigmella trimaculella is a moth of the family Nepticulidae. It is found in most of Europe, east to the eastern part of Palearctic realm.

The thick erect hairs on the head vertex are ochreous-yellowish. The collar is white. Antennal eyecaps are whitish. The forewings are dark fuscous; a broad median longitudinal patch extending from base to near middle, and large opposite sometimes confluent triangular costal and dorsal spots beyond middle whitish-yellowish. Hindwings are grey. Abdomen of male yellowish, crimson-tinged. External image

Adults are on wing in May and again in August.

The larvae feed on Populus alba, Populus angustifolia, Populus x canadensis, Populus candicans, Populus canescens, Populus deltoides, Populus nigra, Populus simonii, Populus suaveolens, Populus tremula and Populus trichocarpa. They mine the leaves of their host plant. The mine consists of a corridor. The first part of the mine is straight and narrow, and often follows a vein. The frass is concentrated in a nearly uninterrupted central line that does not occupy the full width of the gallery . The second part is considerably broader, sometimes almost resembling a blotch. The frass pattern here is very variable, ranging from a narrow central line to a broad band.

References

External links
Fauna Europaea
Swedish Moths
Stigmella trimaculella images at  Consortium for the Barcode of Life
lepiforum.de

Nepticulidae
Moths described in 1828
Moths of Europe
Moths of Asia